Anti-Federalist Papers is the collective name given to the works written by the Founding Fathers who were opposed to or concerned with the merits of the United States Constitution of 1787. Starting on 25September 1787 (eight days after the final draft of the US Constitution) and running through the early 1790s, these Anti-Federalists published a series of essays arguing against a stronger and more energetic union as embodied in the new Constitution. Although less influential than their counterparts, The Federalist Papers, these works nonetheless played an important role in shaping the early American political landscape and in the passage of the United States Bill of Rights.

History 

Following its victory against the British in the Revolutionary War, the United States was plagued by a variety of internal problems. The weak central government could not raise taxes to cover war debts and was largely unable to pass legislation. Many early American politicians and thinkers believed that these issues were the result of the Articles of Confederation, the first governing document of the United States. In 1787 a convention gathered in Philadelphia to attempt to amend it. Soon, however, the gathering shifted its focus to constructing a newer and more powerful Constitution for the fledgling country. Two main competing factions emerged, the Federalists and the Anti-Federalists. The former supported a more powerful central government while the latter opposed it.

During the lengthy and heated national debate following this convention, both groups wrote extensively in favor of their respective positions. The Anti-Federalist papers are a selection of the written arguments against the US Constitution by those known to posterity as the Anti-Federalists. As with the Federalist papers, these essays were originally published in newspapers. The most widely known are "a series of sixteen essays published in the New York Journal from October 1787 through April 1788 during the same period. The Anti-Federalist was appearing in New York newspapers, under the pseudonym 'Brutus'."

Structure and content 
The Anti-Federalist papers were written over a number of years and by a variety of authors who utilized pen names to remain anonymous, and debates over authorship continue to this day. Unlike the authors of The Federalist Papers, a group of three men working closely together, the authors of the Anti-Federalist papers were not engaged in an organized project. Thus, in contrast to the pro-Constitution advocates, there was no one book or collection of Anti-Federalist Papers at the time. The essays were the product of a vast number of authors, working individually rather than as a group. Although there is no canonical list of anti-federalist authors, major authors include Cato (likely George Clinton), Brutus (likely either Melancton Smith, Robert Yates or perhaps John Williams), Centinel (Samuel Bryan), and the Federal Farmer (either Melancton Smith, Richard Henry Lee, or Mercy Otis Warren). Works by Patrick Henry and a variety of others are often included as well.

Until the mid-20th century, there was no united series of Anti-Federalist papers. The first major collection was compiled by Morton Borden, a professor at Columbia University, in 1965. He "collected 85 of the most significant papers and arranged them in an order closely resembling that of the 85 Federalist Papers". The most frequently cited contemporary collection, The Complete Anti-Federalist, was compiled by Herbert Storing and Murray Dry of the University of Chicago and published in 1981. At seven volumes and including many pamphlets and other materials not previously published in a collection, this work is considered, by many, to be the authoritative compendium on the publications.

Considering their number and diversity, it is difficult to summarize the contents of the Anti-Federalist papers. Generally speaking they reflected the sentiments of the Anti-Federalists, which Akhil Reed Amar of the Yale Law School generalized as: a localist fear of a powerful central government, a belief in the necessity of direct citizen participation in democracy, and a distrust of wealthy merchants and industrialists. Essays with titles such as "A Dangerous Plan of Benefit Only to The 'Aristocratick Combination and "New Constitution Creates a National Government; Will Not Abate Foreign Influence; Dangers of Civil War And Despotism" fill the collection, and reflect the strong feelings of the authors.

In the table below, a selection of Anti-Federalist papers have been contrasted with their Federalist counterparts.

Legacy 
The Anti-Federalists proved unable to stop the ratification of the US Constitution, which took effect in 1789. Since then, the essays they wrote have largely fallen into obscurity. Unlike, for example, The Federalist No. 10 written by James Madison, none of their works are mainstays in college curricula or court rulings. The influence of their writing, however, can be seen to this day – particularly in the nature and shape of the United States Bill of Rights. Federalists (such as Alexander Hamilton, in Federalist 84) vigorously argued against its passage but were in the end forced to compromise.

See also 
 Anti-Federalism
 The Complete Anti-Federalist
 The Federalist Papers
 Letters of Centinel
 List of pseudonyms used in the American Constitutional debates

Citations

General and cited references 
 The Documentary History of the Ratification of the Constitution, Vols. XIII–XVI. Ed. John P. Kaminski and Gaspare J. Saladino. Madison: State Historical Society of Wisconsin, 1981.
 The Anti-Federalist Papers. Morton Borden. Lansing: Michigan State University Press, 1965.

External links 
 

 Federalist No. 1-10 | Alexander Hamilton, John Jay, James Madison

 
1787 essays
Ratification of the United States Constitution
The Federalist Papers
Works published under a pseudonym